John George Stewart (born 14 November 1914; date of death unknown) was a Scottish amateur footballer who played in the Scottish League for Kilmarnock and Queen's Park as a wing half. He was capped by Scotland at amateur level.

References 

Scottish footballers
Queen's Park F.C. players
Scottish Football League players
Scotland amateur international footballers
Association football wing halves
Year of death missing
People from Maryhill
1914 births
Kilmarnock F.C. players